Red Lake is a lake in Orlando, Florida, United States, near Orlando International Airport, between Lake Nona and Lake Buck.

External links

City of Orlando: Red Lake Quick Facts

Lakes of Orange County, Florida
Geography of Orlando, Florida
Lakes of Florida